Kieran Brian Darlow (born 9 November 1982 in Bedford, England) is an English former footballer.

Darlow started his career with York City in 1999. He left in 2002 to join Frickley Athletic.

External links

1982 births
Living people
Sportspeople from Bedford
English footballers
Association football fullbacks
Association football midfielders
Association football forwards
York City F.C. players
English Football League players
Frickley Athletic F.C. players
Footballers from Bedfordshire